Ranchettes is a census-designated place (CDP) in Laramie County, Wyoming, United States. It is part of the Cheyenne, Wyoming Metropolitan Statistical Area. The population was 5,798 at the 2010 census.

Geography
Ranchettes is located at  (41.187332, -104.792173).

Demographics
As of the census of 2000, there were 4,869 people, 1,764 households, and 1,488 families residing in the CDP. The population density was 94.7 people per square mile (36.6/km2). There were 1,812 housing units at an average density of 35.2/sq mi (13.6/km2). The racial makeup of the CDP was 94.97% White, 0.88% African American, 0.86% Native American, 0.92% Asian, 0.02% Pacific Islander, 1.40% from other races, and 0.94% from two or more races. Hispanic or Latino of any race were 4.79% of the population.

There were 1,764 households, out of which 34.5% had children under the age of 18 living with them, 75.7% were married couples living together, 5.3% had a female householder with no husband present, and 15.6% were non-families. 12.1% of all households were made up of individuals, and 3.7% had someone living alone who was 65 years of age or older. The average household size was 2.76 and the average family size was 2.98.

In the CDP, the population was spread out, with 25.3% under the age of 18, 6.6% from 18 to 24, 23.5% from 25 to 44, 35.9% from 45 to 64, and 8.7% who were 65 years of age or older. The median age was 42 years. For every 100 females, there were 98.4 males. For every 100 females age 18 and over, there were 97.2 males.

The median income for a household in the CDP was $72,758, and the median income for a family was $74,901. Males had a median income of $48,534 versus $32,963 for females. The per capita income for the CDP was $27,134. About 3.7% of families and 4.7% of the population were below the poverty line, including 5.9% of those under age 18 and 7.4% of those age 65 or over.

Education
Public education in the community of Ranchettes is provided by Laramie County School District #1.

References

Census-designated places in Laramie County, Wyoming
Census-designated places in Wyoming